Denis d'Inès, real name Joseph-Victor-Octave Denis, (1 September 1885 - 25 October 1968) was a French actor and theatre director for some plays. He entered the Comédie-Française in 1914, was a sociétaire from 1920 to 1953, and General administrator by intérim in 1945.

Filmography 

1910: Hop-Frog (by Henri Desfontaines)
1910: Le Scarabée d'or (by Henri Desfontaines)
1911: Falstaff (Short, by Henri Desfontaines)
1911: Olivier Cromwell (Short, by Henri Desfontaines)
1911: La Mégère apprivoisée (by Henri Desfontaines)
1911: Le Roman de la momie (by Henri Desfontaines)
1913: Shylock (by Henri Desfontaines)
1938: La Tragédie impériale (by Marcel l'Herbier) - Évèque Gregorian
1938: Le Héros de la Marne (by André Hugon) - l'abbé Riton
1939: Savage Brigade (by Jean Dréville)
1944: La Malibran (by Sacha Guitry) - Berryer
1945: Boule de suif (by Christian-Jaque) - Le curé d'Uville
1948: D'homme à hommes (by Christian-Jaque) - Général Dufour
1948: The Lame Devil (by Sacha Guitry) - Don Basile dans 'Le barbier de Séville'
1950: Cartouche, roi de Paris (by Guillaume Radot)
1950: Véronique (by Robert Vernay)
1951: Les Deux Gamines (by Maurice de Canonge) - M. Bertal
1951: Paris Still Sings (by Pierre Montazel) - Le maître d'hôtel
1952: Leathernose (by Yves Allégret) - Le duc de Laval
1952: Procès au Vatican (by André Haguet) - L'évêque de Bayeux
1954: On Trial (by Julien Duvivier) - Pierre - Paul Maurizius
1954: Madame du Barry (by Christian-Jaque) - Cardinal Richelieu
1955: Napoléon (by Sacha Guitry) - Siéyès (uncredited)
1955: Andrea Chénier (by Clemente Fracassi) - Contessa di Coigny
1955: Le Souffle de la liberté (by Clemente Fracassi)
1956: Si Paris nous était conté (by Sacha Guitry) - Fontenelle
1959: Drôles de phénomènes (by Robert Vernay) - Gaëtan du Chastelet (final film role)

Theatre

Outside the Comédie-Française 
1905: Vers l'amour by Léon Gandillot, mise en scène André Antoine, Théâtre Antoine
1908: Parmi les pierres by Hermann Sudermann, Théâtre de l'Odéon  
1909: La Mort de Pan by Alexandre Arnoux, mise en scène André Antoine, Théâtre de l'Odéon 
1909: Beethoven by René Fauchois, mise en scène André Antoine, Théâtre de l'Odéon
1909: Les Grands by Pierre Veber and Serge Basset, Théâtre de l'Odéon  
1909: La Bigote by Jules Renard, mise en scène André Antoine, Théâtre de l'Odéon
1910: Cœur maternel by Oscar Franck, mise en scène André Antoine, Théâtre de l'Odéon
1911: L'Armée dans la ville by Jules Romains, mise en scène André Antoine, Théâtre de l'Odéon
1911: Rivoli by René Fauchois, Théâtre de l'Odéon 
1911: Musotte by Guy de Maupassant and Jacques Normand, Théâtre de l'Odéon  
1912: La Foi by Eugène Brieux, Théâtre de l'Odéon  
1912: Troilus and Cressida by William Shakespeare, mise en scène André Antoine, Théâtre de l'Odéon 
1912: L'Honneur japonais by Paul Anthelme, Théâtre de l'Odéon
1912: Le Double Madrigal by Jean Auzanet, mise en scène André Antoine, Théâtre de l'Odéon  
1912: Faust by Johann Wolfgang von Goethe, Théâtre de l'Odéon
1913: La Maison divisée by André Fernet, Théâtre de l'Odéon  
1913: Rachel de Gustave Grillet, Théâtre de l'Odéon  
1913: La Rue du Sentier by Pierre Decourcelle and André Maurel, Théâtre de l'Odéon
1914: Le Bourgeois aux champs by Eugène Brieux, Théâtre de l'Odéon
1917: Manon en voyage opéra comique in 1 act by Jules Massenet and Claude Terrasse, Théâtre Édouard VII

Comédie-Française 
 Admission at the Comédie-Française in 1914
 Sociétaire de 1920 à 1953
 Administrateur général par intérim from 1 July 1945 to October 1945 
 Dean from 1945 to 1953
 361th sociétaire
 Sociétaire honoraire in 1954

1914: Le Prince charmant by Tristan Bernard, Comédie-Française  
1919: L'Hérodienne by Albert du Bois, Comédie-Française  
1920: La Fille de Roland by Henri de Bornier, Comédie-Française
1920: L'Amour médecin by Molière, Comédie-Française 
1920: Romeo and Juliet by William Shakespeare, Comédie-Française 
1920: Le Repas du lion by François de Curel, Comédie-Française  
1920: Les Deux Écoles by Alfred Capus, Comédie-Française   
1920: Barberine by Alfred de Musset, mise en scène Émile Fabre, Comédie-Française  
1921: La Robe rouge by Eugène Brieux, Comédie-Française
1921: La Coupe enchantée by Jean de La Fontaine and Champmeslé, Comédie-Française 
1921: Les Fâcheux by Molière, Comédie-Française
1921: Monsieur de Pourceaugnac by Molière, Comédie-Française 
1921: Un ami de jeunesse by Edmond Sée, Comédie-Française  
1922: Le Festin de pierre by Molière, Comédie-Française
1922: Marion Delorme by Victor Hugo, Comédie-Française  
1922: Vautrin by Edmond Guiraud after Honoré de Balzac, Comédie-Française
1923: Le Dépit amoureux by Molière, Comédie-Française
1923: Un homme en marche by Henry Marx, Comédie-Française    
1924: Molière et son ombre by Jacques Richepin, Comédie-Française  
1924: Quitte pour la peur by Alfred de Vigny, Comédie-Française  
1924: Manon by Fernand Nozière, Théâtre de la Gaîté
1925: Bettine by Alfred de Musset, Comédie-Française  
1925: Hedda Gabler by Henrik Ibsen, Comédie-Française
1925: Maître Favilla by Jules Truffier after George Sand, Comédie-Française
1927: La Torche sous le boisseau by Gabriele D'Annunzio, Comédie-Française
1933: La Tragédie de Coriolan by William Shakespeare, mise en scène Émile Fabre, Comédie-Française
1935: Madame Quinze by Jean Sarment, mise en scène de l'auteur, Comédie-Française  
1935: Lucrezia Borgia by Victor Hugo, mise en scène Émile Fabre, Comédie-Française  
1936: La Rabouilleuse by Émile Fabre after Honoré de Balzac, mise en scène Émile Fabre, Comédie-Française
1938: Le Bourgeois gentilhomme by Molière, mise en scène Denis d'Inès, Comédie-Française
1938: Tricolore by Pierre Lestringuez, mise en scène Louis Jouvet, Comédie-Française   
1939: Le Mariage de Figaro by Beaumarchais, mise en scène Charles Dullin, Comédie-Française
1939: Cyrano de Bergerac by Edmond Rostand, mise en scène Pierre Dux, Comédie-Française    
1939: Le Jeu de l'amour et de la mort by Romain Rolland, mise en scène Denis d'Inès, Comédie-Française
1940: On ne badine pas avec l'amour by Alfred de Musset, mise en scène Pierre Bertin, Comédie-Française  
1940: Twelfth Night by William Shakespeare, mise en scène Jacques Copeau, Comédie-Française
1941: Lucrèce Borgia by Victor Hugo, mise en scène Émile Fabre, Comédie-Française  
1941: Léopold le bien-aimé by Jean Sarment, mise en scène Pierre Dux, Comédie-Française
1941: Le Beau Léandre by Théodore de Banville and Paul Siraudin, directed by Denis d'Inès Comédie-Française
1941: La Farce de Maître Pathelin, Comédie-Française
1942: Gringoire by Théodore de Banville, mise en scène Denis d'Inès, Comédie-Française
1943: Vidocq chez Balzac by Émile Fabre after Honoré de Balzac, mise en scène Émile Fabre, Comédie-Française
1943: Boubouroche by Georges Courteline, Comédie-Française
1943: Courteline au travail by Sacha Guitry, Comédie-Française
1943: La Dame de minuit by Jean de Létraz, directed by Denis d'Inès
1944: La Seconde Surprise de l'amour by Marivaux, directed by Pierre Bertin, Comédie-Française 
1944: Le Bourgeois gentilhomme by Molière, mise en scène Pierre Bertin, Comédie-Française 
1944: Le Malade imaginaire by Molière, mise en scène Jean Meyer, Comédie-Française
1945: Antony and Cleopatra by William Shakespeare, mise en scène Jean-Louis Barrault, Comédie-Française
1946: Le Voyage de monsieur Perrichon by Eugène Labiche and Édouard Martin, mise en scène Jean Meyer, Comédie-Française
1946: Le Mariage de Figaro by Beaumarchais, mise en scène Jean Meyer, Comédie-Française
1947: Ruy Blas by Victor Hugo, mise en scène Pierre Dux, Comédie-Française
1950: A Winter Tale by William Shakespeare, mise en scène Julien Bertheau, Comédie-Française  
1951: L'Arlésienne by Alphonse Daudet, mise en scène Julien Bertheau, Comédie-Française at the Théâtre de l'Odéon   
1951: Madame Sans Gêne by Victorien Sardou, mise en scène Georges Chamarat, Comédie-Française
1951: Le Bourgeois gentilhomme by Molière, mise en scène Jean Meyer, Comédie-Française  
1952: The Clouds by Aristophane, mise en scène Socrato Carandinos, Comédie-Française
1952: Romeo and Juliet by William Shakespeare, mise en scène Julien Bertheau, Comédie-Française

Theater director 
1938: Le Bourgeois gentilhomme, Comédie-Française
1939: Le Jeu de l'amour et de la mort by Romain Rolland, Comédie-Française
1942: Gringoire by Théodore de Banville, Comédie-Française
1945: Une visite de noces by Alexandre Dumas fils, Comédie-Française
1948: Lucrezia Borgia by Victor Hugo, Comédie-Française

External links  
 
 Les archives du spectacle

French male stage actors
French male film actors
French male silent film actors
20th-century French male actors
Administrators of the Comédie-Française
Male actors from Paris
1885 births
1968 deaths
Sociétaires of the Comédie-Française